Helvis of Lusignan (c. 1190 – c. 1218) was the daughter of Amalric II of Jerusalem, King of Cyprus, and his wife, Eschive d'Ibelin.

She was married twice.
Firstly, she was given in marriage to Eudes de Dampierre, a French knight, in about 1205. With Eudes she had children, including eldest son
 Richard de Dampierre.
The details of her second marriage are revealed in a letter from Pope Innocent III to the archbishop of Antioch, dated September 1211. Helvis had been taken from her husband (or fled him) by the young Raymond-Roupen of Antioch, designated heir to the Armenian throne, and although ecclesiastical authorities commanded the return to her husband Eudes de Dampierre, Helvis refused. The young couple seem to have been encouraged by Helvis' brother-in-law, Walter of Montbéliard, which infuriated Helvis' brother King Hugh.

She and Raymond-Roupen had issue:

 Maria of Antioch-Armenia (1215–1257); married Philippe de Montfort, Lord of Castres, of Tyre, and of Toron (died 1270)
 Eschive d'Antioche (who seems to have died young). Critical genealogists have concluded that she did not marry Hetoum, Lord of Lampron (1220–1250), of the House of Hetoumid, although a lot of older genealogical fantasies present that marriage.

References

Sources 
 This page is a translation of :fr:Helvis de Lusignan.

1190 births
1218 deaths
12th-century women
13th-century women
House of Lusignan
Princesses of Antioch
Daughters of kings